Columbariidae, known as pagoda shells, are a family of large deepwater sea snails, marine gastropod mollusks in the superfamily Turbinelloidea. Some 60 extant species have been described.

This family was previously considered a subfamily (Columbariinae) in the family Turbinellidae, according to the taxonomy of the Gastropoda by Bouchet & Rocroi in 2005.

Distribution
Many columbariid species are found worldwide in deep water.

Genera
Genera in the family Columbariidae include:
 † Clavogyra Leroy, 2018 
Columbarium - type genus
Coluzea Finlay [in Allan], 1926
Fulgurofusus
Fustifusus
Halia
Histricosceptrum Darragh, 1969: synonym of Fulgurofusus (Histricosceptrum) Darragh, 1969 represented as Fulgurofusus Grabau, 1904
Peristarium
Pusionella
Serratifusus
Tropidofusus Harasewych, 2018

References

Sources
 Tomlin J.R. le B. (1928). Reports on the marine Mollusca in the collections of the South African Museum, III. Revision of the South African Nassariidae (olim Nassidae). IV. Families Terebridae, Columbariidae, Thaididae, Architectonicidae. Annals of the South African Museum. 25(2): 313–335, pls 25–26. page(s): 330
 Bouchet P., Rocroi J.P., Hausdorf B., Kaim A., Kano Y., Nützel A., Parkhaev P., Schrödl M. & Strong E.E. (2017). Revised classification, nomenclator and typification of gastropod and monoplacophoran families. Malacologia. 61(1-2): 1-526

 
Turbinelloidea